Lilian Bola Bach is a Nigerian actress and model.

Early life and education
Lilian was born in Lagos Island to a Yoruba mother and a Polish father. As a result of her father's profession, she lived in various parts of the country during her formative years, attending Army Children's school, Port Harcourt and Idi Araba Secondary School, Lagos. She briefly majored in theatre arts at the University of Lagos She lost her father at the age of ten.

Modelling and acting career
Lilian came into the limelight in the 1990s as a model. She also competed in the Most Beautiful Girl in Nigeria pageant and featured in several television commercials, becoming the face of Delta medicated soap. She commenced her acting career in 1997, starring in several Nollywood movies of the Yoruba and English genres.

Personal life 
Lilian married business mogul, Mr Alaka, in 2012. She is a Pentecostal Christian.

Selected filmography
Eletan (2011)
High Blood Pressure (2010)
Eja Osan (2008)
Angels of Destiny (2006)
The Search (2006)
Joshua (2005)
Mi ose kogba (2005)
A Second Time (2004)
Big Pretenders (2004)
Ready to Die (2004)
Broken Edge (2004)
Lost Paradise (2004)
Ogidan (2004)
The Cartel (2004)
True Romance (2004)
Market Sellers (2003)
Not Man enough (2003)
Outkast (2001)
Married to a Witch (2001)
High Street Girls

References

External links

1970s births
Living people
Yoruba actresses
Nigerian film actresses
Nigerian people of Polish descent
Actresses from Lagos
University of Lagos alumni
20th-century Nigerian actresses
21st-century Nigerian actresses
Actresses in Yoruba cinema
Yoruba beauty pageant contestants
Beauty pageant contestants from Lagos
Nigerian Pentecostals
Nigerian models
Nigerian female models
Nigerian beauty pageant contestants
Most Beautiful Girl in Nigeria contestants